Chloropterus bimaculatus is a species of leaf beetle of Algeria and Morocco described by Achille Raffray in 1873.

References

Eumolpinae
Beetles of North Africa
Beetles described in 1873